Shunmugam Jayakumar  (born 12 August 1939), often known as S. Jayakumar, is a Singaporean former politician, diplomat, lawyer and author who served as Deputy Prime Minister of Singapore between 2004 and 2009. A member of the governing People's Action Party (PAP), he was the Member of Parliament (MP) for Bedok SMC between 1980 and 1988, the Bedok division  of Bedok GRC between 1988 and 1997, and later East Coast GRC between 1997 and 2011.

Jayakumar served as Minister for Foreign Affairs between 1994 and 2004, Minister for Home Affairs between 1988 and 1994, Minister for Law between 1988 and 2008, Minister for Labour between 1984 and 1985, Senior Minister and Coordinating Minister for National Security concurrently between 2009 and 2011.

He was appointed as Deputy Prime Minister in 2004 after Lee Hsien Loong stepped down as Deputy Prime Minister and take up the office of Prime Minister. He was serving as Deputy Prime Minister alongside Tony Tan and Wong Kan Seng. In June 2020, he was appointed Pro-Chancellor of the National University of Singapore.

Education
Jayakumar was educated at Raffles Institution before graduating from the University of Singapore (now the National University of Singapore) with a Bachelor of Laws with honours degree and was called to the Bar in 1964.

He subsequently went on to complete a Master of Laws degree at Yale Law School in 1966.

Career

Academia career
Upon his return to Singapore, Jayakumar took on a lecturing position in the Faculty of Law at the National University of Singapore between 1964 and 1981, assuming the position of Dean in 1974, which he held until 1980.

Diplomatic career
Jayakumar concurrently served as Singapore's Permanent Representative to the United Nations and Singapore's High Commissioner to Canada between 1971 and 1974. He was also a member of Singapore's delegation to the United Nations Convention on the Law of the Sea between 1974 and 1979.

Jayakumar also authored three books and 32 articles on the topics of constitutional law, international law and legal education.

Political career
In 1980, Jayakumar was elected as the Member of Parliament (MP) representing the Bedok constituency. He remained as the MP for the Bedok constituency after the 1988 general election but this time under the newly created Bedok GRC. 

During the 1991 general election, he remained as the MP for the Bedok constituency but this time under the newly created East Coast GRC. He retained his seat in 1997 general election and 2006 general election.

In 1981, Jayakumar was appointed as Minister of State for Home Affairs and Minister of State for Law. He first served in Prime Minister Lee Kuan Yew's Cabinet in 1984 as Minister for Labour, Second Minister for Home Affairs and Second Minister for Law.

Jayakumar was appointed Minister for Home Affairs and Second Minister for Law on 2 January 1985.

In 1988, Jayakumar was appointed Minister for Law and Minister for Home Affairs. He retained these portfolios under Prime Minister Goh Chok Tong.

In January 1994, Jayakumar was appointed Minister for Foreign Affairs and Minister for Law.

On 12 August 2004, Jayakumar was appointed Deputy Prime Minister and Minister for Law under Prime Minister Lee Hsien Loong's Cabinet. On 1 September 2005, Jayakumar took over the role as Coordinating Minister for National Security from Tony Tan to oversee counter-terrorism policies in Singapore.

Jayakumar stepped down as Minister for Law on 30 April 2008, and as Deputy Prime Minister on 1 April 2009.

Publications
Jayakumar has written and published several books related to his life and experiences in foreign affairs and diplomacy. In 2009, Jayakumar and Ambassador-at-Large Tommy Koh published the book titled Pedra Branca: The Road to the World Court, which covers the territorial dispute between Malaysia and Singapore over Pedra Branca, a small island of strategic value located near the entry point to the Straits of Malacca. 

In 2011, Jayakumar published a book titled Diplomacy: A Singapore Experience. The book covers his reflections on many events and episodes during his many years in public service. It also shared behind-the-scenes political decision making that governed Singapore's responses during important post-independence events that formed the basis of Singapore's foreign policy principles. 

In 2015, he published a memoir titled Be at the Table or Be on the Menu: A Singapore Memoir, which covers his early life and his career as a law academic and dean before he entered politics. 

In 2019, Jayakumar, Ambassador-at-Large Tommy Koh and Deputy Attorney-General Lionel Lee launched the book titled "Pedra Branca: Story Of The Unheard Cases", which recounts how Singapore's team prepared in the dispute with Malaysia over the sovereignty of Pedra Branca and also serves as a continuation to Pedra Branca: The Road to the World Court. 

In November 2020, Jayakumar launched his book titled Governing: A Singapore Perspective, which covers his views and experiences of Singapore's governance, such as how he viewed the Lee family dispute over their 38 Oxley Road home, and Prime Minister Lee Hsien Loong's retirement plan if the COVID-19 crisis has not improved.

Retirement from politics
Jayakumar was appointed a Senior Minister on 1 April 2009 before retiring from politics on 21 May 2011.
He decided not to contest in the 2011 general election citing health reasons. He also resigned as a permanent member of the Presidential Council for Minority Rights which he was appointed to the position on 1 July 1998. 

After retirement, he served as Chair of the National University of Singapore Faculty of Law's Advisory Council and Patron of the NUS Centre for International Law. He is Emeritus Professor at the National University of Singapore's Faculty of Law. He is also presently a consultant with Drew & Napier. He is currently appointed as a pro-chancellor of the National University of Singapore for a three year term starting from 1 July 2020. 

On 4 April 2021, during the National Day Awards, Jayakumar was bestowed the Order of Temasek (With High Distinction), the nation's highest civilian honour, by President Halimah Yacob for his "wide-ranging, invaluable and unique contributions to the well-being and security of Singapore". In the investiture ceremony, he was praised for having "given his entire life to the service of Singapore" and the citation of his award said: "Uniquely among public servants, Prof Jayakumar brought an exceptionally keen legal mind to bear on a considerable range of issues, from national security and foreign policy to political and constitutional developments."

Honours
 :
  Public Service Star (1980)
  Order of Temasek with High Distinction (2020)
 :
  Grand Cordon of the Order of the Rising Sun (2012)

References

Bibliography
 
(Contains official documents, press statements and speeches, correspondence between ministers of Singapore and Malaysia and text of the water agreements)

External links
Official Biography of Prof. S. Jayakumar in the Cabinet of Singapore.

1939 births
Academic staff of the National University of Singapore Faculty of Law
Living people
Members of the Cabinet of Singapore
Members of the Parliament of Singapore
National University of Singapore alumni
Yale Law School alumni
People's Action Party politicians
Singaporean people of Tamil descent
Singaporean politicians of Indian descent
Raffles Institution alumni
Grand Cordons of the Order of the Rising Sun
Recipients of the Darjah Utama Temasek
Singaporean Tamil politicians
Singaporean Hindus
Singaporean people of Indian descent
20th-century Singaporean lawyers
Ministers for Foreign Affairs of Singapore
Ministers for Law of Singapore
Ministers for Home Affairs of Singapore
Deputy Prime Ministers of Singapore
Ministers for Labour of Singapore
21st-century Singaporean lawyers